Neuromodulation: Technology at the Neural Interface is a peer-reviewed medical journal covering clinical, translational, and basic science research in the field of neuromodulation. It was established in 1998 by founding editor Elliot S. Krames and is published by Elsevier on behalf of the International Neuromodulation Society. The editor-in-chief is Robert M. Levy.

Abstracting and indexing 
The journal is abstracted and indexed in:

According to Wiley, the publisher until 2022, the journal has a 2019 impact factor of 4.029.

References

External links 
 

Neurology journals
Elsevier academic journals
Hybrid open access journals
English-language journals
Publications established in 1998